Mooroolbark College is a government secondary school situated in Victoria, Australia, near the Dandenong Ranges and the Yarra Valley. It has a student population of around 1,160 (fluctuating between 1,100 and 1,200).

The school operates a house system across all year levels. Vertical homegroups allow senior students to provide leadership and role models for younger students. The houses are recognised by colours, and each has its own name: Red Devils, Blue Thunder, Green Machine and Yellow Stingers.

External links
 

Public high schools in Victoria (Australia)
Buildings and structures in the Shire of Yarra Ranges
Educational institutions established in 1973
1973 establishments in Australia